The Southern African Catholic Bishops' Conference (SACBC) is an episcopal conference consisting of all the bishops of the Roman Catholic Church in South Africa, Botswana, and Swaziland, and their equivalents under canon law (apostolic vicars, apostolic administrators, etc.). Founded in March 1947, it is a collegial body approved by the Holy See and has as its particular aim:

In recent times, the Conference's application of the revision of the English translation of the Mass liturgy has been criticized as premature.

Organization
The conference is led by a president and two vice presidents, each elected by an absolute majority of the members for three year terms. The members also elect chairmen and vice-chairmen for the departments of the conference. All office holders must be diocesan ordinaries; coadjutor bishops, auxiliary bishops, and bishops emeriti may not be elected. The president, vice presidents, department chairmen, and any Cardinals who do not hold a conference office form an administrative board which coordinates the conference's activities between its plenary sessions. 

The Conference mandates a Secretariat to Coordinate Conference activities. The Secretariat is made up of Departments (such as the Justice and Peace department), Offices (such as the AIDS Office) and Associate Bodies (such as the Denis Hurley Peace Institute (DHPI). It has a 51% share in the Catholic weekly newspaper (since 2020 monthly magazine), "The Southern Cross".

Presidents

See also 
 Catholic Church in Africa

References

External links
Southern African Catholic Bishops' Conference official website
SACBC webpage. GCatholic website

Africa Southern
Catholic Church in Africa
Catholic Church in South Africa
Catholic Church in Botswana
Catholic Church in Eswatini
Southern Africa